A Fjell or Fell is a high and barren landscape feature in Fennoscandia, the Isle of Man, parts of Northern England, and Scotland.

Fjell may also refer to:

People
Anders Fjell (born 1974), a Norwegian psychologist, neuroscientist and professor
Jan-Erik Fjell (born 1982), a Norwegian novelist
Kai Fjell (1907-1989), a Norwegian painter, printmaker and scenographer
Olav Fjell (born 1951), a Norwegian businessperson

Places
Fjell, a former municipality in the old Hordaland county, Norway
Fjell (village), a village in Øygarden municipality in Vestland county, Norway
Fjell Church, a church in Øygarden municipality in Vestland county, Norway
Fjell Church (Drammen), a church in Drammen municipality in Viken county, Norway
Fjell Fortress, a fortress on the island of Sotra in Vestland county, Norway
Fjell, Innlandet, a village in Nord-Odal municipality in Innlandet county, Norway
Fjell skole, a school in Drammen municipality in Viken county, Norway